Offa is a city in the Kwara State of Nigeria, with a population of about 120,100 inhabitants. The town is noted for its weaving and dyeing trade, using vegetable dyes made from locally grown indigo and other plants. Offa is well known for cultivation of sweet potatoes and maize which also formed part of the favourite staple foods of the indigenes in the town. Cattle, goats and sheep are also raised in the environs. The main religions practised in the town are Islam, Christianity and traditional religions.

The ancient tradition for which the town is known is wrestling. Offa's rich history is comprehensively documented in a book written by James Bukoye Olafimihan an educationist and clergyman titled 'Iwe Itan Offa', literally translated The Book of the History of Offa.

Offa is on the railway line from Lagos, the former capital of Nigeria, and Offa served as the railway terminus before the line was extended north to Kano and Nguru. Offa is the second largest town in Kwara state, located in central Nigeria with geographic coordinates o itf 8’9N 4’43E. Offa was founded towards the end of the 14th century by a Yoruba prince from Oyo. The traditional head is the Olofa, who is assisted by prominent knighted chiefs including Essa, Ojomu, Balogun, Shawo and Asalofa. The praise name of Offa is "Ijakadi loro Offa", a Yoruba phrase meaning "wrestling is our game". The city's mascot is the peacock bird which is one of the most prominent exotic avian species in the region and also because the town is a beautiful place.  Offa has more recently become well known in Nigeria for being home to Adesoye College, one of the most prominent private schools in Nigeria. Offatedo in Osun state, Iyana Offa in Oyo State, Offa in Côte d'Ivoire were established by the people from Offa. 

Offa is centrally located in the midst and middle of many neighboring towns like Erin Ile in the south, Ijagbo in the north, Igosun and Ipee in the east and Ilemona, Irra, Ikotun and Ojoku in the west.

There is a big market located within the city centre, known as " Owode market". The market which is the only major market in the Offa Local Government has existed for nearly 40 years. The market serve both the members of the community and its neighboring towns.

Traditional institutions

The supreme traditional ruler (king) of the town is the Olofa who is assisted by five High Chiefs namely Asalofa, Essa, Ojomu, Sawo, and Balogun. There are two hundred and five thousand traditional households. Since the founding of the town in late 14th century, twenty four Kings, (Olofas) have ruled as follows:

List of Olofas in Order of Succession

1. Olalomi Olafagangan – the founder of Offa who came from Oyo through Ile-Ife (1392–1442)

2. Olutide – 1442 -1491

3. Olugesinde – 1491-1526

4. Oluwole – 1526-1567

5. Okunmolu – 1567-1624

6. Olusanle – 1624-1679

7. Olusanmi – 1679-1726

8. Olugbense – 1726-1786

9. Bamgbola Arojojoye – 1786-1800

10. Amodu Agaka – 1800-1803

11. Olumorin Anilelerin – 1803-1832

12. Alade Alebiosu – 1832-1844

13. Ariyibi Omolaoye – 1844-1850

14. Morounfolu Okunoye – 1850-1882

15. Adegboye Atoloyetele – 1882–1887, and 1901–1906

16. Arokan Otaogbaye – 1887-1901

17. Oyediran Ariwajoye I – 1906-1917

18. Adeyeye Arojojoye – 1917-1920

19. Abioye – 1921-1926

20. Esuwoye I – 1926-1936

21. Wuraola Isioye – 1936-1957

22. Mustapa Keji – 1957-1969

23. Mustapha Olanipekun Ariwajoye II – 1970–2010

24. Mufutau Gbadamosi Esuwoye II – 2010–present

Educational institutions

Offa indigenes are well educated and the town has over one hundred professors in varied academic fields. There are several secondary schools, three polytechnics, and a university. The first primary school, St. Mark's (Anglican) Primary School was established in 1912 by the Church Missionary Society, and Offa Grammar School which is the first community secondary school in defunct Northern Nigeria was established in 1943. The Kwara State College of Health Technology was also established earlier in 1976 The Federal Polytechnic,Offa was established in 1992. Other tertiary institutions include the Navy School of Health Sciences, Pan Africa College of Education Graceland Polytechnic, Lens Polytechnic and Summit University, Offa (the University of Ansarudeen Society of Nigeria). Summit University was established in 2015 and commenced academic activities in 2017. In 2020, it obtained full accreditation from the National Universities Commission for all its academic Courses.

Socio-cultural organizations

The umbrella socio-cultural organisation in Offa is Offa Descendants Union which was founded in Lagos, Nigeria by Offa indigenes on 13 October 1935. All other socio-cultural groups in the town are affiliates of ODU. The union has branches in all states of Nigeria and abroad. It has been involved in development efforts like the establishment of secondary schools, encouragement of investors, medical outreaches, supporting artisans, and other professional bodies.

Cultural ceremonies

"Offa" means arrow in the Yoruba language, and the founder of the town was known as Olofagangan-the warrior with a sharp arrow. Offa is the cultural headquarters of the Ibolo people, which was regarded as an integral part of the old Oyo Empire. The Ibolos are also found in the present Osun State. The major traditional ceremony is 'Onimoka', which is an annual event to celebrate the memory of Queen Moremi an Offa indigene who saved the Ile-Ife kingdom from invaders. During the ceremony, wrestling contests are held in which the traditional Chiefs including the Olofa will engage in mock wrestling contests (Ijakadi). According to the Olofa, during the eight editions of the festival in December 2019, the festival demonstrates Offa people's “love for equity, justice, and fairness as well as the resilience and unity of the community (the Sun news online). Offa is also well known for the Owode market, the foremost market and pivot of economic activities not only for Offa and its environment but also for Kwara and neighbouring states.

Bibliography
Olafimihan, James Bukoye: Iwe Itan Offa (The Book of the History of Offa).

References

External links 
 http://www.lenspolytechnic.edu.ng/
 https://www.britannica.com/place/Offa-Nigeria

Local Government Areas in Kwara State
Towns in Yorubaland